Komulainen is a Finnish surname. Notable people with the surname include:

 Jari Komulainen, Finnish businessman
 Joonas Komulainen (born 1990), Finnish ice hockey player
 Juhani Komulainen (born 1953), Finnish composer
 Mikko Komulainen (born 1994), Finnish ice hockey player

Finnish-language surnames